DNA Pro Cycling is a professional UCI Women's Team, based in the United States.

It competes in elite women's road bicycle racing events.  It was founded in 2012, at the end of the 2015 season the team merged with DNA Cycling p/b K4 forming the current UCI-level team.

In October 2019, the team announced that they would return to the UCI rankings.

Team roster

Major wins
2015
Overall San Dimas Stage Race, Amber Neben
Stage 1 (ITT), Amber Neben

2017
 Points classification Redlands Bicycle Classic, Claire Rose
 Mountains classification, Claire Rose
Stage 4, Claire Rose
Stages 2 (ITT) & 4 Cascade Cycling Classic, Claire Rose

2022
 Youth classification Tour of the Gila, Anet Barrera
Stage 4 Joe Martin Stage Race, Maggie Coles-Lyster
Commonwealth Games, Track (Points race), Maggie Coles-Lyster
Overall Tour de Colombia, Diana Peñuela
Stages 1, 2, 3 & 4, Diana Peñuela

National champions
2017
 New Zealand Track (Madison), Michaela Drummond
 British Time Trial, Claire Rose
2019
 New Zealand Track (Omnium), Michaela Drummond
2021
 New Zealand Track (Team Pursuit), Nicole Shields
2022 
 Colombian Road Race, Diana Peñuela
 Canada Road Race, Maggie Coles-Lyster
2023
 Colombian Road Race, Diana Peñuela

References

External links

Cycling teams based in the United States
UCI Women's Teams
Women's sports teams in the United States
Cycling teams established in 2015
2015 establishments in the United States